HMS St George was a 120-gun first rate ship of the line of the Royal Navy, launched on 27 August 1840 at Plymouth.

While in the dockyard and before being put to sea she was at risk of destruction. Estimates for the damage were put at £150,000 in the values of the day, and would have totalled £500,000 had the fire not been contained by demolishing several surrounding buildings.

She was fitted with screw propulsion in 1859, and was sold out of the service in 1883.

Notes

References

Lavery, Brian (2003) The Ship of the Line - Volume 1: The development of the battlefleet 1650-1850. Conway Maritime Press. .
Lyon, David and Winfield, Rif (2004) The Sail and Steam Navy List: All the Ships of the Royal Navy 1815-1889. Chatham Publishing, London. .

External links
 

Ships of the line of the Royal Navy
Caledonia-class ships of the line
Ships built in Plymouth, Devon
1840 ships